Ivan Voshchyna (6 September 1957 – 5 September 2015) was a Ukrainian musician, drummer of the bands "Pikkardiyska Tertsiya" and "The Mandry" ("Lvivs'ki mandry"). He worked with "Pikkardiyska Tertsiya" since 2008.

As a member of "Pikkardiyska Tertsiya", he gave his last concert in Lutsk on September 5, 2015 and died shortly after it in the dressing room. According to the report of the organizers of the concert, it was thrombosis that caused the musician's sudden death. Ivan Voshchyna had only 1 more day to live before he became 58.Ivan was buried in Sokil'nyky, his native village not far from Lviv.

References

Links 
 Rest in peace, dear friend.

Ukrainian musicians
1957 births
2015 deaths